The men's Greco-Roman 97 kilograms is a competition featured at the 1998 World Wrestling Championships, and was held at the Gavlerinken in Gävle, Sweden from 27 to 29 August 1998.

Medalists

Results

Round 1

Round 2

Round 3

Round 4

Round 5

Round 6

Round 7

Finals

References

External links
UWW Database

Men's Greco-Roman 97 kg